Pierre Faillu (1 January 1897 – 28 March 1974) was a French racing cyclist. He rode in the 1923 Tour de France.

References

1897 births
1974 deaths
French male cyclists
Place of birth missing